General elections were held in the Gambia in 1960, following the implementation of a new constitution, which created a House of Representatives. The new legislature had 19 elected seats, twelve seats were elected in the protectorate and seven in the colony (Bathurst and Kombo St Mary). Eight seats were reserved for chiefs. In addition, the Governor-general, the Speaker (appointed by the governor-general after consultation with council members), the Civil Secretary, the Financial Secretary, the Attorney General and the Commissioner for Local Government and up to three nominated members were also members of the House.

The People's Progressive Party won nine of the 19 elected seats. However, United Party leader Pierre Sarr N'Jie became the country's first Chief Minister in March the following year, appointed by Governor-general Edward Windley after a majority of the eight chiefs supported him.

Results

References

Gambia
Parliamentary elections in the Gambia
1960 in the Gambia
1960
Election and referendum articles with incomplete results